Brazil–New Zealand relations refers to the diplomatic relations between Brazil and New Zealand. Both nations are members of the Cairns Group and the United Nations.

History 
During European colonialism, both Brazil and New Zealand would have been in contact when Portuguese ships carrying goods from Brazil traded with British ships carrying goods from New Zealand. As early as 1874, New Zealand census show Brazilians residing in New Zealand. During World War II, soldiers from Brazil and New Zealand fought together during the Italian Campaign (1943-1945). Both nations are founding members of the United Nations.

Official diplomatic relations between Brazil and New Zealand were established in 1964. In 1997, Brazil opened an embassy in Wellington. In November 2001, New Zealand Prime Minister Helen Clark paid a visit to Brazil, the first by a New Zealand Prime Minister, and inaugurated the New Zealand embassy in Brasília. In 2010, a Working Holiday visa scheme was agreed between both nations. In 2013, New Zealand Prime Minister John Key paid a visit to Brazil. His visit included an official meeting with Brazil's President Dilma Rousseff.

Brazilians are the largest Latin American community in New Zealand. In 2018, both nations held the VIII Brazil-New Zealand Political Consultation Meeting, in Brasília.

High-level visits

High-level visits from Brazil to New Zealand

 Foreign Minister Celso Amorim (2008)

High-level visits from New Zealand to Brazil

 Prime Minister Helen Clark (2001)
 Prime Minister John Key (2013)
 Governor General Jerry Mateparae (2016)

Trade
In 2018, total trade between both nations amounted to US$204 million. Brazil's main exports to New Zealand include: coffee in grains, orange juice and tobacco. New Zealand's main exports to Brazil include: dairy products, kiwifruit and fish.

Resident diplomatic missions 

 Brazil has an embassy in Wellington.
 New Zealand has an embassy in Brasília and a consulate-general in São Paulo.

See also 
 List of ambassadors of New Zealand to Brazil

References

 
New Zealand
Bilateral relations of New Zealand